Monasterace is a comune (municipality) in the Province of Reggio Calabria in the Italian region Calabria, located about  south of Catanzaro and about  northeast of Reggio Calabria. The ruins of the ancient Greek city Caulonia are located a short distance north of the frazione Monasterace Marina, on the coast. Also north of Monasterace Marina is the Monasterace Archeological Museum, where finds from Caulonia are exhibited.

See also
Monasterace Archeological Museum
Monasterace-Stilo railway station
Vallata dello Stilaro
Punta Stilo Lighthouse

References

 
Cities and towns in Calabria
Vallata dello Stilaro